WOUB-FM (91.3 MHz) is a public radio station in Athens, Ohio. Owned by Ohio University, it is the flagship of a five-station network known as Ohio University Public Radio.  The studios and offices are on South College Street in Athens.  

WOUB-FM has an effective radiated power (ERP) of 50,000 watts, the current maximum for Ohio FM stations.  The transmitter is on Bittersweet Lane, near Ohio State Route 56 in Athens, co-located with the tower for WOUB-TV 20.

Programming
By day, WOUB-FM airs mostly news and informational programs, many from NPR.  Daytime shows include Morning Edition, All Things Considered, Here and Now, 1A and Fresh Air with Terry Gross.

At night, it broadcasts music shows, focusing on a mix of musical genres: Adult Album Alternative,  Bluegrass, Americana and World Music.  Nighttime music shows include Crossing Boundaries, World Cafe, The Thistle & Shamrock, Afropop Worldwide and Mountain Stage.

History
WOUB debuted in 1942 as WOUI, a carrier current station broadcasting from Ewing Hall on the Ohio University campus. On July 10, 1959, it changed its call sign to WOUB-FM.

In its early years, it aired educational programs and classical music.  Many of the voices were students or staff at the university.  In 1963, WOUB-TV channel 20 made its debut.  WOUB-FM later became a member of National Public Radio and added its news and music shows to its line up.

Rebroadcasters
The station serves most of southern and southeastern Ohio, plus portions of neighboring West Virginia and Kentucky, through a network of repeater stations:

Ohio University Public Radio also operates WOUB AM 1340, which offers a public radio schedule different from FM.

Images

References

External links
Ohio University Public Radio

FCC History Cards for WOUB-FM

OUB
Ironton, Ohio
Ohio University
NPR member stations
Mass media in Athens, Ohio